Mississippi is currently divided into 4 congressional districts, each represented by a member of the United States House of Representatives. After the 2020 census, the number of Mississippi's seats remained unchanged.

Current districts and representatives
List of members of the United States House delegation from Mississippi, their terms, their district boundaries, and the district political ratings according to the CPVI. The delegation has a total of 4 members, including 3 Republicans and 1 Democrat.

Apportionment history
From 1789 to 1817, the Mississippi Territory was represented in Congress by a non-voting delegate. Since becoming a state on December 10, 1817, Mississippi has sent between one and eight representatives to Congress.

Mississippi was granted statehood on December 10, 1817.

Historical and present district boundaries
Table of United States congressional district boundary maps in the State of Mississippi, presented chronologically. All redistricting events that took place in Mississippi between 1973 and 2013 are shown.

Obsolete districts

At-large district

Mississippi's at-large congressional district existed from the granting of statehood in 1817 to 1847 and again from 1853 to 1855.

5th district

The fifth congressional district was created after the 1850 census and abolished following the 2000 census.

6th district

The sixth congressional district was created after the 1870 census and abolished following the 1960 census.

7th district

The seventh congressional district was created after the 1880 census and abolished following the 1950 census.

8th district

The eighth congressional district was created after the 1900 census and abolished following the 1930 census.

See also

List of United States congressional districts

References